Chafford was an ancient hundred in the south west of the county of Essex, England. Its area has been partly absorbed by the growth of London; with its name reused for the modern housing development of Chafford Hundred. Its former area now corresponds to part of the London Borough of Havering in Greater London and parts of the districts of Brentwood and Thurrock in Essex.

History

Hundred meetings are thought to have taken place in Chafford Heath in the southern part of the ecclesiastical parish of Upminster.

The hundred contained the parishes of Aveley, Brentwood, Childerditch, Cranham, Grays Thurrock, Great Warley, Little Warley, North Ockendon, Rainham, South Ockendon, South Weald, Stifford, Upminster, Wennington and West Thurrock.

It bordered Ongar hundred to the north, Barstable hundred to the east and Havering liberty to the west. The River Thames formed a  boundary with Kent to the south. The hundred covered a narrow area stretching  northwards from the river.

Replacement

The hundreds of England declined in administrative use because of the rise of various ad-hoc boards. By 1894 they were effectively replaced by a system of uniform local government districts, which were consolidated over time and finally replaced by the London boroughs (1965) and non-metropolitan districts (1974), further change occurred in 1998 when Thurrock became a unitary authority.

See also
Hundreds of Essex

References

History of the London Borough of Havering
Borough of Brentwood
History of local government in London (pre-1855)
Hundreds of Essex
History of Thurrock